Sergey Sergeevich Zelikov (born 31 January 1974) is a former Russian professional footballer.

Club career
In 1993, he returned from FC Obninsk to FC SKA Rostov-on-Don.

He played two seasons in the Russian Football National League for FC SKA Rostov-on-Don and FC Dynamo Saint Petersburg.

References

1974 births
Sportspeople from Astrakhan Oblast
Living people
Soviet footballers
Russian footballers
Association football forwards
FC SKA Rostov-on-Don players
FC Volgar Astrakhan players
FC Lokomotiv Nizhny Novgorod players
FC Dynamo Saint Petersburg players